The Finnish Sportspersonality of the Year is chosen annually since 1947 by the national sports journalists. In addition, the best female athlete was nominated each year until 2009.

Winners

Men

Women

See also
 Finnish Footballer of the Year

References

Sport in Finland
National sportsperson-of-the-year trophies and awards
Awards established in 1947
1947 establishments in Finland